The 2018 Saint John's Johnnies football team represented Saint John's University in the 2018 NCAA Division III football season. The Johnnies, led by sixth-year head coach Gary Fasching, were members of the Minnesota Intercollegiate Athletic Conference (MIAC) and played their home games at Clemens Stadium in Collegeville, Minnesota.

Schedule 
Saint John's 2018 schedule consists of 6 home and 4 away games in the regular season. The Johnnies hosted UW-Stout, Carleton, St. Thomas, St. Olaf, Hamline, and Thomas More. Away games were at Gustavus Adolphus, Augsburg, Bethel, and Concordia-Moorhead.

For the playoff quarterfinals, the Johnnies travelled to Belton, Texas to face Mary Hardin–Baylor, where their season ended with a 21–18 loss to the Crusaders.

References

Saint John's
Saint John's Johnnies football seasons
Minnesota Intercollegiate Athletic Conference football champion seasons
Saint John's Johnnies football